Húsareyn is a mountain located on the island of Streymoy.

The mountain overlooks the Faroese capital, Tórshavn, from the northwest and is clearly visible around the town. It is a popular hiking destination for tourists because of its easy accessibility from the capital.

External links
Photo of the mountain

Faroe Islands
Mountains of the Faroe Islands
Geography of the Faroe Islands